Steinstraße is an underground rapid transit station located at Deichtorplatz, between Steinstraße and Deichtorwall in the Altstadt of Hamburg, Germany. The station was opened in 1960 and is served by Hamburg U-Bahn line U1.

Service

Trains 
Steinstraße is served by Hamburg U-Bahn line U1; departures are every 5 minutes.

Gallery

See also 

 List of Hamburg U-Bahn stations

References

External links 

 Line and route network plans by hvv.de 

Hamburg U-Bahn stations in Hamburg
U1 (Hamburg U-Bahn) stations
Buildings and structures in Hamburg-Mitte
Railway stations in Germany opened in 1960
1960 establishments in West Germany